The Chief of Army is the most senior appointment in the Malaysian Army and has been held by a four-star officer in the rank of General since 1977. The Chief of Army is a member of the Malaysian Armed Forces Council and directly reports to the Chief of the Armed Forces.

The current Chief of Army is General Tan Sri Zamrose Mohd Zain, who succeeded General Tan Sri Ahmad Hasbullah Mohd Nawawi who retired on 11 June 2020.

Appointees
Official name for the position in English language.

 1956–1959: General Officer Commanding, Federation of Malaya Army
 1959–1969: Chief of General Staff
 1969–present: Chief of Army

Living former Chiefs of Army

See also 
 Malaysian Army
 Chief of Defence Forces (Malaysia)
 Chief of Navy (Malaysia)
 Chief of Air Force (Malaysia)

References 

  Senarai Panglima Tentera Darat - Tentera Darat Malaysia (in Malay)

Malaysian Army
Military of Malaysia
Ministry of Defence (Malaysia)
Malaysia